In 2001, Sam the Kid released an instrumental album entitled Beats Vol 1: Amor. Using resources like vinyl, discs, soap operas, videos and recorded phone calls among others, STK created a unique audiophilic world, inspired by the love of his parents, to whom he dedicated the album. The single he released for this album is called "Alma Gémea".

Track listing

2002 albums
Sam the Kid albums